James Tedesco (born 8 January 1993), nicknamed "Teddy",  is a professional rugby league footballer who plays as a  and captains the Sydney Roosters in the NRL, New South Wales rugby league team and Australia.

He previously played for the Wests Tigers. He has played for Italy and Australia at international level.

Tedesco has played at representative level for the Prime Minister's XIII, New South Wales City and New South Wales in the State of Origin series. He is a dual NRL premiership winning player of 2018 and 2019.

Background
Tedesco was born in the north-western Sydney suburb of Ryde, New South Wales, Australia. His father is of Italian descent. He was raised on a 100 hectare property in Menangle in Sydney's south west, complete with his own football field with goal posts. Tedesco played his junior football with the Camden Rams. His father said of his early years, "James couldn't even make the junior rep squad for Wests when he was 14, and from then on he's always sort of scraped in. But once he's made those teams, he's gone on to finish as the best player."

Tedesco was a student of St Gregory's College, Campbelltown, and was in year 7 when Chris Lawrence was studying year 12, at which point Lawrence had already debuted 1st Grade for their local NRL team Wests Tigers, for whom Tedesco would go on to debut.

Playing career

Early career
Tedesco played on the wing for the Western Suburbs Magpies in the Harold Matthews Cup competition, with David Nofoaluma at fullback. 

In 2010, he made the Australian Schoolboys team. "I made the Australian Schoolboys and I learnt to just have confidence in my own ability. I realised it was there – that I had a bit of talent – I just needed the confidence to show it," he said.

Tedesco commenced the 2011 season playing in the S. G. Ball Cup, but was promoted to the Wests Tigers NYC team from round 13. In just his third game he equaled the club record of scoring 4 tries in one match, and went on to be named the team's player of the year.

2012
Attracting the attention of other clubs, Tedesco was the focus of a "bidding war" between the Wests Tigers and St George Illawarra, resulting in the Tigers signing him until the end of 2014. Weeks later, he was named at fullback for the team's first trial-match for the year. However, coach Tim Sheens said he was unlikely to be playing at fullback at the start of the regular season, saying, "'I don't necessarily want to throw that on him at this point. I've got some experienced options."

Having played well in both pre-season trials, Tedesco was named in the starting team to play the Cronulla Sharks in the first game of the season. After showing potential in the early stages of the game, Tedesco suffered an injury to his knee in the 30th minute. The tear to the anterior cruciate ligament in his left knee was the end of his season. Team-mate Benji Marshall said, "Just seeing his reaction in the sheds, he was crying in there and it brought a tear to a few of the boys' eyes as well, because we see him as such a great talent and he's fitted into the squad well and he's a really good kid."

2013

Tedesco returned to first grade in round 4 of the 2013 season, and played on the wing for four weeks. 

In April, he was chosen to play for NSW City in the annual City vs Country Origin match. Having only appeared in four NRL matches at that time, he was the least experienced player to ever participate in the match. "When they called me up, I thought it was a joke. Even when Brad Fittler got on the phone I didn't think it was real. It was also a problem, because I didn't know whether I was eligible for City or Country," Tedesco said. Tedesco played at fullback in City's 18–12 loss at Coffs Harbour.

With Tim Moltzen moving to halfback before suffering a season-ending injury, Tedesco played most of the rest of the season at fullback, scoring 8 tries in 19 matches. He spent months playing with a cracked fibula, after being advised that he was unlikely to make the injury any worse by playing. Tedesco said the leg was painful when knocked. "It does kill for about five minutes or so, then you run it off and it goes away." 

At the end of the season, Tedesco was chosen to represent Italy at the 2013 Rugby League World Cup. With Anthony Minichiello captaining and playing at fullback, Tedesco played at right centre for the three games. In his international debut, he scored a try as Italy defeated Wales 32–16.

2014
In February, Tedesco was selected in the Tigers inaugural Auckland Nines squad. 

On 27 May, he signed a 3-year contract with the Canberra Raiders starting in 2015. A week later, Tedesco back flipped on his deal with the Raiders to stay with the Tigers. During the round 16 clash with the Raiders, Tedesco lasted 15 seconds before he fractured his patella. Tedesco missed the rest of the season. Tedesco said, ""On Twitter Canberra fans would say 'I hope you break your legs' and stuff like that and then I play Canberra and it happens. It is a bit weird. It was just a freak accident." Before the end of the year, Tedesco had returned to sprint training and was adjusting his running style to be less "low to the ground". 

He finished the NRL season with 8 matches and 6 tries.

2015
After an "eye-catching" display in round 2, Tedesco was touted as a possible State of Origin selection. While Tedesco said he felt ready to play in the representative matches, coach Jason Taylor said, "I think that's too early. It was a really good first half and he showed what he can do, but I think that's a bit too early for where he's at."

Between 19 August 2013 and round 7 of the 2015 season, Tedesco had scored 18 tries in 19 appearances. He played in every game of 2015 and was the competition's leader for tackle breaks and the third highest try-scorer. From round 10 onwards, Tedesco ran for over 100 metres in each game, with the fourth highest total in the competition. He was named in the NRL website's Team of the Year and was a finalist for the Rugby League Players Association's highest honour, the Player's Player.

2016
Tedesco started the 2016 season by scoring 2 tries against the New Zealand Warriors in round 1 and his first career hat-trick against the Manly Warringah Sea Eagles in round 2. He suffered a shoulder injury in round 9, making him unavailable for the City Origin side. At the time of his injury he was the competition's leading try-scorer.

Considered a certainty to play for New South Wales in the first match of the State of Origin series, he was unavailable due to injury, and was not selected for the second when he returned from injury only weeks before. Making his debut in game 3, he ran for 258 metres, the most of any player in the game, as NSW won their only match of the series. Gus Gould got a bit excited when Teddy was running the ball towards the try line in the final moments of the game, keeping the viewers on the edge of their seats by famously shouting "go teddy!". It was said he "Showed enough in 80 minutes to suggest the No.1 jersey will be his for many years to come."

With Wests Tigers fighting to make the semis towards the end of the year, Tedesco had his jaw broken in a tackle from Ryan James, ending his season. 

He recovered to represent the Prime Minister's XIII against Papua New Guinea, but left the field with concussion in the first half. 

He scored 14 tries in 17 matches with the Tigers. He was named the fullback in the Dally M team of the year.

2017
In March and April, Tedesco alongside Tigers captain Aaron Woods and halves partners Luke Brooks and Mitchell Moses attracted media attention, with speculation about where the players, dubbed as the "Big Four" would end after all of their contracts expired at season's end. On 3 May, it was announced that Tedesco signed a 4-year contract with the Sydney Roosters, starting in the 2018 season. 

Tedesco played fullback in all 3 matches in the 2017 State of Origin series, scoring a try in the game 1 victory before going down the next 2 matches to lose the shield to Queensland. 

Tedesco finished his last year with the Wests Tigers with him playing in 21 matches and scoring 5 tries.

On 12 September at the Rugby League Players' Association's awards night, Tedesco was voted player of the year by his peers.

On 23 September, Tedesco played for Prime Minister's XIII against Papua New Guinea, playing at fullback and scoring 3 tries in the 48–8 win in Port Moresby. 

On 5 October 2017, after missing on selection in the Australia Kangaroos squad, Tedesco was instead named in the 24-man Italy squad for the 2017 Rugby League World Cup. 

After Italy's shock 36–12 defeat by Ireland in Cairns in Game 1 of their pool matches, Tedesco was king hit by fellow Italian teammate Shannon Wakeman while having drinks at Pier Bar in Cairns. Tedesco was talking to Wakeman's girlfriend which led to the altercation. Tedesco then told Italian officials not to sack Wakeman over the incident and that it was just a misunderstanding. He went on to say "It was just a miscommunication between myself and him, there were a few drinks and it quickly escalated", "We were all there after the loss, we wanted to get away from it all a bit. It's sad it happened. The next morning we met, shook hands and he apologised". Tedesco played in all 3 matches and scored 2 tries in the tournament.

2018
Tedesco made his debut for the Sydney Roosters in a Round 1 loss to his former club of the Wests Tigers, starting at fullback, and was subjected to boos from the Tigers supporters every time he touched the ball. Having just recovered from a case of the mumps Tedesco was not at his best and bombed a certain try by dropping a pass from Blake Ferguson after he made a break down the touchline during the Roosters shock upset 10–8 loss at ANZ Stadium.

In Round 2 against the Canterbury-Bankstown Bulldogs, Tedesco scored his first try for the Roosters in the 30–12 win at Sydney Football Stadium.  

On 28 May, Tedesco retained his spot at fullback for NSW, and earned his first Origin man of the match. On 10 September, Tedesco was awarded the Brad Fittler medal as being NSW's best player in the 2018 State of Origin series.

Tedesco was part of The Roosters side which won their fourth minor premiership in six years.  On 30 September, Tedesco played at fullback in Sydney's 21–6 victory over Melbourne in the 2018 NRL grand final.

Tedesco's fantastic first year at the Roosters was capped off when he won the Jack Gibson Medal, awarded to the club's best player from the past year of football, as well as being named to debut for the Australian Kangaroos in Mal Meninga's 19 man squad.

2019
Tedesco played in all 3 games of New South Wales' successful origin campaign in 2019, ultimately winning the Wally Lewis Medal for best player in the series. He scored two tries in the deciding game at ANZ Stadium, the 2nd one winning NSW the game in the 79th minute.

In Round 20 against the Gold Coast, Tedesco scored 2 tries as the Sydney Roosters won the match 58–6 at the Sydney Cricket Ground.

On 2 October, Tedesco won the 2019 Dally M Medal as the NRL's best player with 34 votes.

At the end of the 2019 regular season, the Sydney Roosters finished in 2nd place on the table and qualified for the finals.  

In the preliminary final against Melbourne, Tedesco scored the winning try in a 14–8 victory.  In the 2019 NRL Grand Final against Canberra, Tedesco scored the winning try in the second half as the Sydney Roosters won their second consecutive premiership and also Tedesco's second premiership as a player.

On 7 October, Tedesco was named at Fullback in the Australian side for their Oceania Cup test against New Zealand.

2020
On 22 February, Tedesco played for the Roosters in their 2020 World Club Challenge victory defeating St Helens 20–12.

In round 5, Tedesco scored a hat-trick as the Sydney Roosters defeated Canterbury-Bankstown 42–6 at Bankwest Stadium. In round 17, he scored two tries as the Roosters defeated Canberra 18–6 in the grand final rematch at GIO Stadium.

In the 2020 semi final, Tedesco scored two tries as the Roosters lost 22–18 to Canberra at the Sydney Cricket Ground, ending their chance of winning a third straight premiership.

He was awarded the Jack Gibson Medal for the third year running, the first time this has been accomplished by any player,

Tedesco was selected by New South Wales for the 2020 State of Origin series. He played in all three matches and was captain for game 2 and 3, as Boyd Cordner was injured. Tedesco 
himself was injured in game 3 as New South Wales suffered a shock 2–1 series defeat against Queensland.

On 7 December, Tedesco signed a three-year contract extension to stay at the Sydney Roosters until the end of the 2024.

2021
In round 1 of the 2021 NRL season, Tedesco scored a hat-trick in the Sydney Roosters 46–4 victory over Manly-Warringah at the Sydney Cricket Ground.

The following week, he scored two tries and kicked two goals against his former club, the Wests Tigers, in a 40–6 victory and captained the Roosters for the first time.

On 30 May, he was selected for game one of the 2021 State of Origin series.

In round 19, the Sydney Roosters defeated the Newcastle Knights 28–8 as Tedesco came up against the Maroons' Game III no. 1, Kalyn Ponga. He and his team fought back from being eight points down. Tedesco ran for 224 metres and had four try assists, four line-break assists and seven tackle breaks to lead his team to their 12th win of the season.

In round 22, he scored two tries for the Sydney Roosters in a 21–20 victory over Brisbane.
The following week, Tedesco put in a man of the match performance, scoring a try and providing four try assists in the club's 40–22 victory over St. George Illawarra.

On 27 September 2021, Tedesco won the Dally M Captain of the Year.  Tedesco played a total of 22 games for the Sydney Roosters in the 2021 NRL season including the club's two finals matches.  The Sydney Roosters would be eliminated from the second week of the finals losing to Manly 42–6.

On 25 October, Tedesco was placed under investigation by the NRL after an alleged racist incident with a 20-year-old woman of Vietnamese descent at the Beach Road Hotel in Bondi.  It is alleged by the woman that Tedesco approached her said "squid games" before laughing with his group.  The woman claimed she stood behind her friend who challenged Tedesco about the comment, before the Roosters captain allegedly laughed and asked the women whether they knew who he was.  The Sydney Roosters club completed their own investigation into the matter and said they believed the incident was simply a matter of miscommunication.

On 12 November, Tedesco was fined $10,000 by the NRL for drunken and disorderly behaviour in relation to the incident.

2022
In round 9 of the 2022 NRL season, Tedesco scored a hat-trick in the clubs 44–16 victory over the Gold Coast.
On 29 May, Tedesco was selected by New South Wales to play in game one of the 2022 State of Origin series.

Tedesco played in all three games for New South Wales as they lost the series 2–1.  In round 18, Tedesco scored two tries in a 54–26 victory over St. George Illawarra.

Tedesco played a total of 24 games for the Sydney Roosters in 2022 scoring 13 tries. At the end of the season, Tedesco was announced as the Rugby League Players Association Players' Champion for a third time (he had previously won the player-voted award in 2017 and 2019). 

In October he was named in the Australia squad for the 2021 Rugby League World Cup. Tedesco was part of the Australian side which won their 12th World Cup defeating Samoa 30-10 in the final with Tedesco being named man of the match after scoring two tries.

Personal life
Tedesco completed his PE Teacher degree at the Strathfield campus of Australian Catholic University in 2016.

Controversy
In 2021, Tedesco was fined A$10,000 by the NRL for behaving in a drunken and disorderly manner and bringing the game into disrepute after he shouted "Squid Games" at a woman of Vietnamese descent outside a Sydney hotel. The Sydney Roosters and Tedesco initially claimed that nothing inappropriate had occurred and that a misunderstanding had occurred, and no internal sanction was imposed. In March 2022, Tedesco addressed the media and stated that he had apologised for his behaviour to the female in question.

References

External links

Sydney Roosters profile
Wests Tigers profile
2017 RLWC profile

1993 births
Living people
Australian Catholic University alumni
Australia national rugby league team captains
Australian rugby league players
Australian people of Italian descent
Australian people of Maltese descent
Italy national rugby league team players
New South Wales Rugby League State of Origin players
New South Wales City Origin rugby league team players
Rugby league fullbacks
Rugby league players from Sydney
Sportsmen from New South Wales
Sydney Roosters captains
Wests Tigers players